Hurricane Earl was a long-lived, large hurricane that mostly stayed out at sea, but brought heavy rain to Puerto Rico and Newfoundland. The fifth named storm and second hurricane of the 2022 Atlantic hurricane season, originated from a tropical wave that moved off the coast of Africa on August 25. The wave struggled to develop over the next week as it moved west-northwestward in a marginally conducive environment. Eventually, the system was able to organize enough to be designated as Tropical Storm Earl on September 3. Earl started to shift northward after impacting parts of the Caribbean. Strong wind shear halted Earl from rapidly intensifying, and it maintained tropical storm status. After impacting the Caribbean, it shifted northward and started to intensify. Earl eventually reached Category 2 hurricane status, before repeated dry air entrainments caused the storm to fluctuate in intensity. Earl reached peak winds of  twice before quickly becoming extratropical off the coast of Newfoundland on September 10. It continued moving northeast before dissipating on September 15.

Meteorological history 
 
Earl originated from a tropical wave that was producing widespread disorganized showers and thunderstorms when it formed off the coast of Africa on August 25. After moving west across the eastern and central tropical Atlantic, the disturbance was met with environmental conditions east of the Leeward Islands that were only marginally conducive for a tropical cyclone's development. After struggling against high wind shear for many days, the disturbance was finally able to organize itself and developed into Tropical Storm Earl early on September 3. A burst of deep convection occurred near the center of Earl during the evening of September 5, and a Hurricane Hunter's mission into the storm later that night reported that it briefly strengthened to near hurricane strength. Earl's intensity continued to fluctuate throughout much of the next day due to ongoing effects of westerly deep-layer shear. Later that day, the shear quickly diminished, resulting in Earl becoming better organized and strengthening into a hurricane at around 00:00 UTC on September 7. By 03:00 UTC on September 8, Earl had reached Category 2 strength, still moving northward; Hurricane Hunters data showed it to have developed an eye of almost  and a fairly symmetric wind field. After maintaining this intensity for several hours, Earl weakened down to a Category 1 hurricane again at 15:00 UTC on September 10, and then transitioning into an extratropical cyclone due south of Cape Race, Newfoundland six hours later. Earl continued to move northeast after becoming extratropical and moved north of the Azores, approaching Europe. Earl continued to spiral north before dissipating on September 15 after "losing its identity" north of the Azores.

Preparations and impacts 

In Salinas, Puerto Rico, 2 people died after being struck by lightning while riding a jet ski. As Earl passed east of Florida, strong swells hit the eastern coast of the state. A large swell caused by Earl hit Cape Hatteras, North Carolina. Rip currents hit Surf City, North Carolina. Along the East Coast of the United States, large swells hit many states. Rip currents also hit many areas of New England. There were localized power outages across the archipelago but no major damage was reported. L.F. Wade International Airport reported gusts of 50-60 mph. Other parts of the island saw 1-3 inches of rainfall. All travel to the territory was cancelled as Earl passed, including bus travel on the island. Nova Scotia saw "life-threatening" swells. Similar rainfall amounts were also observed in communities throughout the Avalon Peninsula. Hurricane-force winds hit Grand Bank. Additionally, the cyclone caused rough surf which damaged the breakwater on the coast near Trepassey, Newfoundland and Labrador, bringing localized flooding to the area. A wall holding out water was destroyed in Trepassey after large waves from Earl hit it. As far out as St. Anthony, Newfoundland and Labrador saw heavy rains associated with Earl. Despite being far away from the United Kingdom and Ireland, the countries still saw heavy rainfall and rough surf from its outer bands.

See also 
 Weather of 2022
 Tropical cyclones in 2022
 Timeline of the 2022 Atlantic hurricane season
 Other storms of the same name
 Hurricane Earl (2010) – Category 4 hurricane that took a similar path about 12 years earlier.
 Hurricane Fiona – Category 4 hurricane that took a similar track a few weeks later.
 Hurricane Larry – Category 3 hurricane that took a similar track the previous year.
 Hurricane Sam – Category 4 hurricane that took a similar track the previous year.

References 

2022 meteorology
Earl
Earl
Earl
Earl
Earl